Daniel Paul Muller (born February 21, 1976) is an American college basketball coach, formerly the men's basketball head coach at his alma mater Illinois State University.

Biography
Muller was born in Lafayette, Indiana to parents Cliff and Tricia. He attended Lafayette Central Catholic High School, graduating in 1994.

After high school, Muller attended Illinois State University. On the Illinois State Redbirds men's basketball team, Muller played as a forward from 1994 to 1998 under head coach Kevin Stallings. In his sophomore season, the team finished second in the MVC regular season, and fell to Tulsa in the semifinals of the conference tournament. They earned a bid to the National Invitation Tournament (NIT), where they advanced to the quarterfinals before falling to Tulane. During Muller's final two seasons, the Redbirds won back-to-back MVC regular-season and tournament titles, appearing in the 1997 and 1998 NCAA Division I Tournaments. In the 1998 tournament, Muller scored the game-winning basket in a first round overtime win against Tennessee.

Muller finished his career with 1,445 points and made 128 consecutive starts, which remains a school record. He was a two-time Missouri Valley Conference Defensive Player of the Year (1996 & 1997) and earned the MVC Tournament MOP in his senior season (1998). Muller also excelled academically, becoming a Bone Scholar (ISU's highest academic honor) and a two-time GTE Academic All-American. He graduated in 1998 with a bachelor's degree in organizational leadership.

After college, Muller played basketball internationally for two seasons: in Argentina (1999) for Team La Rioja Andino, and Belgium (2000) for Siemens Ghent.

In 2001, Muller was hired by his former ISU coach Kevin Stallings as an assistant at Vanderbilt University. He spent 12 years with the Commodores, helping lead the program to seven 20-win seasons and six NCAA tournament appearances. In 2006, he also took over as Vanderbilt's recruiting coordinator, and built some of the highest-rated recruiting classes in school history.

In 2012, Muller was hired as the head coach at his alma mater, Illinois State. In his first season, the team posted a 18–15 record and finished 6th in the MVC standings. In 2013-14, they earned a bid to the College Basketball Invitational (CBI), where they advanced to the semifinals before losing to Siena. During the 2014-15 season, the Redbirds finished with a 22–13 record, and made it to the second round of the NIT tournament. Muller's most successful season with the team came in 2016–17, as they went nearly undefeated in conference play (17–1) and finished with a school-record 28 wins (28–7). However, they were unable to secure an automatic NCAA tournament bid, as they fell to No. 21 Wichita State in the MVC Tournament Final. Muller was named MVC Coach of the Year following the season.

In April 2018, Muller agreed to a 5–year contract extension to remain as head coach of the Redbirds. Despite the extension, the team was unable to sustain their previous success under Muller, as they suffered consecutive losing seasons in 2019–20 and 2020–21 for the first time since 2005–06 and 2006–07. He returned for the 2021–22 season, but the Redbirds struggled to a 11–15 overall record and 4–9 mark in MVC play by mid-February.

On February 13, 2022, ISU announced that Muller would be dismissed as head coach following the season, but that he would stay in his position for the remainder of the 2021–22 season at his players' request. However, the next day, he announced that he was stepping down effective immediately, as he was concerned his presence with the team would become a distraction. Muller received a $1 million buyout for the remaining two years on his contract. Following his departure, associate head coach Brian Jones was named as the interim HC for the rest of the season.

Head coaching record

References

External links
 Illinois State profile

1976 births
Living people
American expatriate basketball people in Argentina
American expatriate basketball people in Belgium
American men's basketball coaches
American men's basketball players
Basketball coaches from Indiana
Basketball players from Indiana
College men's basketball head coaches in the United States
Gent Hawks players
Illinois State Redbirds men's basketball coaches
Illinois State Redbirds men's basketball players
Shooting guards
Small forwards
Sportspeople from Lafayette, Indiana
University of Florida alumni
Vanderbilt Commodores men's basketball coaches